Angus is a surname. Notable people with the surname include:

 Alan Angus (1912–1988), Australian racing cyclist
 Alex Angus (1889–1947), Scottish international rugby union and cricket player
 Barbara Angus (1924–2005), New Zealand diplomat and historian
 Charlie Angus (born 1962), Canadian politician
 Colin Angus (explorer), Canadian author and explorer
 Colin Angus (musician) (born 1961), British musician
 W. David Angus (born 1937), Canadian politician
 Derek Angus (born 1938), New Zealand politician
 Geoff Angus (born 1948), Australian football player
 George Angus (disambiguation), multiple people
 Graeme Angus (born 1971), English cricketer
 Harry James Angus (born 1982), Australian musician
 Henry Angus (1891–1991), Canadian lawyer
 Ian Angus (disambiguation), multiple people
 Iain Angus (born 1947), Canadian politician
 Jack Angus (disambiguation), multiple people
 James Angus (disambiguation), multiple people
 Jennifer Angus (born 1961), Canadian artist
 John Angus (disambiguation), multiple people
 Kristi Angus (born 1971), Canadian actress
 Marion Angus, Scottish poet
 Michael R. Angus (1930–2010), British businessman
 Nikitta Angus (born 1988), British musician
 Peggy Angus (1904–1993), British artist
 Richard B. Angus (1831–1922), Canadian railroad financier
 Rita Angus (1908–1970), New Zealand painter
 Ron Angus (born 1956), Canadian judo champion and coach
 Samuel Angus (1881–1943), Australian theologian
 Samuel F. Angus, American baseball executive
 Stevland Angus (born 1980), English football player
 Terry Angus (born 1966), English football player
 Tom Angus (1934–1988), English cricketer
 William Angus (disambiguation), multiple people
 Winfield Angus, American football coach